Ireland competed at the 1996 Summer Olympics in Atlanta, Georgia, in the United States.

Medalists

Ireland won three gold and one bronze medal at the 1996 Olympics, the highest number ever, and was placed 28th in the medals table. Sonia O'Sullivan, who was seen as the best medal chance prior to the competition, did not win a medal.

Michelle Smith was accused of doping, though the accusations were not substantiated at the time.  Two years after the Atlanta Games, FINA banned Smith for four years for tampering with her urine sample using alcohol; the testers also found traces of a metabolic precursor of testosterone, Androstenedione.  Smith was not stripped of her medals, as the test upon which the ban was based was conducted well after the Games.

Gold
 Michelle Smith — Swimming, Women's 400 metres Freestyle
 Michelle Smith — Swimming, Women's 200 metres Individual Medley
 Michelle Smith — Swimming, Women's 400 metres Individual Medley

Bronze
 Michelle Smith — Swimming, Women's 200 metres Butterfly

Results by event

Archery
Ireland again sent only one archer to the Olympics.  Keith Hanlon won his first match, but was defeated in the second round.

Men

Athletics

Men

Women

Boxing

Canoeing

Slalom

Flatwater

Cycling

Road
Men

Track
Pursuits

Points races

Mountain Bike

Equestrian

Eventing

Rowing
Men's Double Sculls
Brendan Dolan 3rd in the repechage (→ Unplaced)
Niall O'Toole 3rd in the repechage (→ Unplaced)
Men's Lightweight Fours
Derek Holland 4th in the A final (→ 4th)
Sam Lynch 4th in the A final (→ 4th)
Neville Maxwell 4th in the A final (→ 4th)
Tony O'Connor 4th in the A final (→ 4th)

Shooting
Rifle

Swimming
Men

Women

References

sports-reference

Nations at the 1996 Summer Olympics
1996
1996 in Irish sport